The National Protective Security Authority (NPSA) is the UK’s National Technical Authority for physical and personnel protective security, maintaining expertise in counter terrorism as well as state threats. 

NPSA is the protective security arm of MI5. It’s a distinct entity, but benefits from access to MI5’s expertise and understanding of the threat.2

NPSA helps organisations understand the range of threats they and the UK face, for example from terrorism, espionage, and state actors, and importantly what they can do to minimise their risk through how they operate day to day. NPSA provide and develop content and guidance that is more accessible to those with no or limited security background, alongside advice for security professionals and technical experts.  

NPSA work with key partners including, but not limited to, the National Cyber Security Centre (NCSC) and the police.

Before March 2023, the National Protective Security Authority was previously called the Centre for the Protection of National Infrastructure (CPNI). 

CPNI was formed on 1 February 2007 from the merger of predecessor bodies the National Infrastructure Security Co-ordination Centre (NISCC) and the National Security Advice Centre (NSAC). NISCC existed to provide advice to companies operating critical national infrastructure, and NSAC was a unit within MI5 that provided security advice to other parts of the UK government.

In 2016 the cybersecurity-related aspects of the CPA's role were taken over by the National Cyber Security Centre, itself a child agency of GCHQ.

See also
 British cyber security community
 British intelligence agencies
 Civil Contingencies Secretariat

References
1https://www.mi5.gov.uk/useful-links

2https://www.mi5.gov.uk/what-we-do

External links

Emergency management in the United Kingdom
Information technology organisations based in the United Kingdom
National security of the United Kingdom
Public bodies and task forces of the United Kingdom government